Limnia is a genus of flies in the family Sciomyzidae, the marsh flies or snail-killing flies.

Species
L. alpina Mayer, 1953
L. appenninica Rivosecchi & Santagata, 1979
L. boscii (Robineau-Desvoidy, 1830)
L. brevicostalis Melander, 1920
L. capensis Schiner, 1868
L. castanea Hutton, 1904
L. claripennis Robineau-Desvoidy, 1830
L. conica Steyskal, 1978
L. dejeani Robineau-Desvoidy, 1830
L. fitchi Steyskal, 1978
L. flavostriata Villeneuve, 1912
L. georgiae Melander, 1920
L. hendeli Mayer, 1953
L. inopa (Adams, 1904)
L. japonica Yano, 1978
L. lemmoni Fisher & Orth, 1971
L. limbata Robineau-Desvoidy, 1830
L. lindbergi Steyskal, 1978
L. louisianae Melander, 1920
L. maculatissima Strobl, 1906
L. mannii Schiner, 1864
L. marginalis Robineau-Desvoidy, 1830
L. mehadiensis Oldenberg, 1923
L. nambai Steyskal, 1978
L. nigrescens Becker, 1907
L. obscura Hutton, 1901
L. pacifica Elberg, 1965
L. paludicola Elberg, 1965
L. pubescens (Day, 1881)
L. sandovalensis Fisher & Orth, 1978
L. saratogensis (Fitch, 1855)
L. setosa Yano, 1978
L. shannoni Cresson, 1920
L. sparsa (Loew, 1862)
L. stiticaria Mayer, 1953
L. striata Hutton, 1904
L. syriaca Mayer, 1953
L. testacea Sack, 1939
L. tranquilla Hutton, 1901
L. transmarina Schiner, 1868
L. unguicornis (Scopoli, 1763)

References

Sciomyzidae
Sciomyzoidea genera